Owlya (also Romanized as Owlyā’) is a village in Pain Velayat Rural District, in the Central District of Taybad County, Razavi Khorasan Province, Iran. At the 2006 census, its population was 18, in 5 families.

References 

Populated places in Taybad County